Ainhoa Artolazábal Royo (born 6 March 1972) is a road cyclist from Spain. She represented her nation at the 1992 Summer Olympics in the women's road race.

References

External links
 profile at sports-reference.com

Spanish female cyclists
Cyclists at the 1992 Summer Olympics
Olympic cyclists of Spain
Living people
People from Tolosa, Spain
1972 births
Cyclists from the Basque Country (autonomous community)